Christos Papageorgiou can refer to:

 Christos Papageorgiou (skier) (1926-1997)
 Christos Papageorgiou (Scouting) (born 1944)